Jules Duchon is a fictional character in Andrew Fox's comic novels, Fat White Vampire Blues and Bride of the Fat White Vampire. He is the protagonist in both novels, a morbidly obese vampire who is often placed in amusingly humiliating or dangerous situations that are distinctly at odds the urbane stereotype typified by Dracula and his ilk.

Discussions About Jules Duchon 
 How Jules Duchon, New Orleans Vampire, Got So Darn Fat
 A Tasty Gumbo in the Big Easy
 Comic and Tragic Representations of Authentic New Orleans Culture

Duchon, Jules
Fictional characters from New Orleans